Mandarin Films Distribution Co. Ltd or Mandarin Cinema (東方電影發行有限公司), formerly known as Mandarin Films Ltd. (東方電影出品有限公司), was a Hong Kong film production company and distributor. It was established in 1991 by film producer Raymond Wong Pak-Ming, and is a subsidiary of Mandarin Entertainment Holdings Ltd.

Company
Since its foundation, Mandarin has been closely involved in producing, licensing and distributing high-quality films, which include Eighteen Spring, The Phantom Lover, The Bride with White Hair, Dragon Tiger Gate, and Flash Point. Up to this moment, Mandarin Films has produced more than 85 films for distribution around the world.

In 2001, Mandarin Films took a big leap by listing its share in the Hong Kong Stock Exchange. With recent strong international interest in Chinese films and powerful new government initiatives to promote films of Hong Kong, Mandarin Films is ideally placed to lead the way in a newly vibrant film industry.

Mandarin aims to produce more and better films, and taking advantage of their PRC collaborations to shoot, market and distribute films and television series, as well as taking advantage of the huge demand for quality films in China itself, Mandarin will also be increasing its promotion of Chinese films to an eager and ever-growing international audience.

References

External links
 

Mass media companies established in 1991
Film production companies of Hong Kong
1991 establishments in Hong Kong
Hong Kong brands